Argythamnia haplostigma is a species of flowering plant in the family Euphorbiaceae, native to the south-west Caribbean (the island of Roatán). It was first described in 1912.

References

Chrozophoreae
Flora of the Southwest Caribbean
Plants described in 1912
Flora without expected TNC conservation status